Elvin Ragnvald Heiberg III (March 2, 1932 – September 27, 2013) was a United States Army general who was Chief of Engineers between 1984 and 1988.

Biography

Born at Schofield Barracks, Hawaii, Heiberg  became a third-generation West Pointer when he graduated fifth in the United States Military Academy class of 1953. He later obtained three master's degrees; the first a Master of Science in civil engineering from the Massachusetts Institute of Technology in 1958, then two  Master of Arts degrees from George Washington University, one in government in 1961 and one in administration. Heiberg graduated from the Army Command and General Staff College in 1965 and the Industrial College of the Armed Forces in 1971.

Early in his military career Heiberg served as operations officer of the 3d Brigade, 3d Infantry Division, in Germany, and taught in the Social Sciences Department at the Military Academy. In 1968-69 he commanded the divisional 4th Engineer Battalion in Vietnam and was awarded a Silver Star. He then served as special assistant and executive assistant to the director, Office of Emergency Preparedness, under the Executive Office of the President.

Heiberg served for a year as executive to Secretary of the Army Howard Callaway. He then headed the United States Army Corps of Engineers' New Orleans District and in 1975-78 the Ohio River Division. He served as senior engineer on the staff of U.S. Army, Europe, in 1978-79. Heiberg was the USACE director of civil works in 1979-82 and then Deputy Chief of Engineers. After managing the army's Ballistic Missile Defense Program for a year, he became Chief of Engineers in 1984. Heiberg, the 46th Chief of Engineers, remains the youngest "Chief" of the Corps of Engineers since 1838, when Brigadier General Totten became the 11th "Chief Engineer" (then the title).
  
Heiberg retired as a lieutenant general (three stars) in June 1988.

As a civilian, Heiberg was chief executive officer of Rollins Field Services, Inc., under the Delaware firm Rollins Environmental Services, 1988-1990. He then moved to J.A. Jones Construction, a major engineering firm headquartered in Charlotte, NC. He headed J.A. Jones Construction Services from 1990–1993 and, in 1992 started J.A. Jones Environmental Services.

In 1993, Heiberg moved back to the Washington DC area and founded Heiberg Associates, Inc., which provides engineering and environmental consulting services to a variety of clients.

Heiberg was elected to the National Academy of Engineering in 1995, and later became a founding member of the National Academy of Construction.  Heiberg often provided volunteer services to the National Research Council, the research/study arm of the two National Academies (Science;Engineering).  Starting in 2000, that work was primarily in reviewing draft reports before they are finalized.

Heiberg married Kathryn ("Kitty") Schrimpf (August 19, 1931 – December 25, 2015) in Kansas in 1953, after graduating from the United States Military Academy. She accompanied Heiberg on most of his military assignments.  They resided in the Washington DC area, where Heiberg Associates was headquartered, and where Mrs. Heiberg ran her own business in antiques, porcelain repair and custom framing ("Creative Concepts").  Among her many volunteer efforts, Mrs. Kitty Heiberg performed work within the Nixon White House and a great variety of Army and Army wives' community efforts.  They had four grown children, all married, and several grandchildren. He died of cancer on September 27, 2013 in Arlington County, Virginia and was interred at Arlington National Cemetery on January 10, 2014. His wife was buried next to him on March 10, 2016.

Awards and decorations
Heiberg's military awards include;
  Army Distinguished Service Medal with Oak Leaf Cluster
  Silver Star
  Legion of Merit with two Oak Leaf Clusters,
  Distinguished Flying Cross
  Bronze Star
  Air Medal with six Oak Leaf Clusters
Army commendation one Oak leaf cluster 
National Defense service medal one Oak Leaf cluster 
Korean war service medal 
Vietnam service medal four  bronze stars
Army service Ribbon 
Army Overseas Service Ribbon Numeral one 
Vietnam Technical Service Honors Medal First class 
United Nations medal Korea 
Republic of Vietnam Campaign Medal with 1960– Device 
 Order of the Crown (Belgium) (Commander)
 Order of Military Merit (Brazil) (Grand Commander)

See also

References

This article contains public domain text from 

1932 births
2013 deaths
People from Honolulu County, Hawaii
United States Military Academy alumni
Massachusetts Institute of Technology alumni
George Washington University alumni
United States Army Command and General Staff College alumni
Dwight D. Eisenhower School for National Security and Resource Strategy alumni
United States Army generals
United States Army Corps of Engineers Chiefs of Engineers

Recipients of the Distinguished Service Medal (US Army)
Recipients of the Order of Military Merit (Brazil)
Recipients of the Legion of Merit
Recipients of the Distinguished Flying Cross (United States)
Recipients of the Air Medal
Recipients of the Silver Star
Commanders of the Order of the Crown (Belgium)
Members of the United States National Academy of Engineering
People from Arlington County, Virginia
Burials at Arlington National Cemetery